Carlo Alberto Tesserin (Chioggia, 15 January 1938) is an Italian politician from Veneto.

A long-time member of Christian Democracy, Tesserin was Vice President of the Region in 1993–1994. Following the dissolution of Christian Democracy, he joined the Italian People's Party, however, in early 2000, he switched his party affiliation to Forza Italia. In 2008 he joined The People of Freedom and in 2013 the New Centre-Right.

He was the longest-serving member of the Regional Council of Veneto, having been elected in 1990, 1995, 2000, 2005 and 2010.

References

Forza Italia politicians
Living people
1938 births
The People of Freedom politicians
21st-century Italian politicians
Italian People's Party (1994) politicians
Members of the Regional Council of Veneto
Christian Democracy (Italy) politicians
20th-century Italian politicians